—From A Prayer for My Daughter by W. B. Yeats, written on the birth of his daughter Anne on February 26

Nationality words link to articles with information on the nation's poetry or literature (for instance, Irish or France).

Events

 April 2 — Vladimir Nabokov, novelist and poet, leaves Russia with his family.
 October — W. B. Yeats travels to the United States and begins a lecture tour lasting until May, 1920.
 December — The Egoist, a London literary magazine founded by Dora Marsden which published early modernist works, including those of James Joyce, goes defunct.
 Two paintings by E. E. Cummings appear in a show of the New York Society of Independent Artists.
 The journal Littérature founded in France by André Breton, Philippe Soupault and Louis Aragon.
 Hilda Doolittle (H.D.) writes Notes on Thought and Vision, a prose work; published posthumously in 1982.

Works published in English

Australia
 Edwin James Brady, The House of the Winds
 John Le Gay Brereton, The Burning Marl, dedicated to "All who have fought nobly"
 C. J. Dennis, Jim of the Hills
 Shaw Neilson, Heart of Spring, Sydney, Bookfellow

Canada
Charles G.D. Roberts, New Poems. (London: Constable).

India, in English

 Swami Ananda Acharya, Snow-birds, London: Macmillan, Indian poetry in English
 Harindranath Chattopadhyaya, The Coloured Garden, Adyar, Madras: The Commonwealth Office; India, Indian poetry in English
 Ardeshir M. Modi, Spring Blossoms, London: Arthur H. Stockwell
 Nanikram Vasanmal Thadani, Krishna's Flute and Other Poems, Bombay: Longmans

United Kingdom
 Richard Aldington
 Images of Desire
 Images of War
 Swami Ananda Acharya, Snow-birds, London: Macmillan, Indian poetry in English
 May Wedderburn Cannan, The Splendid Days
 Eva Dobell, A Bunch of Cotswold Grasses
 Ernest Dowson (died 1900), The Poems and Prose of Ernest Dowson, with a memoir by Arthur Symons
 John Drinkwater, Loyalties
 T. S. Eliot, Ara Vos Prec, including "Gerontion" and the poems later published in Poems – 1920; his "Tradition and the Individual Talent" appears in The Egoist
 Ivor Gurney, War's Embers
 F. W. Harvey, Ducks
 Rudyard Kipling, The Years Between
 C. S. Lewis, writing as Clive Hamilton, Spirits in Bondage: a cycle of lyrics
Bertram Lloyd, ed., The Paths of Glory: A collection of poems written during the War, 1914–1919
 Rose Macaulay, Three Days
 Carola Oman, The Menin Road, and other poems
 Ezra Pound, Quia Pauper Amavi
 Siegfried Sassoon, The War Poems of Sigfried Sassoon
 Dora Sigerson (posthumous), Sixteen Dead Men, and Other Ballads of Easter Week
 Osbert Sitwell, Argonaut and Juggernaut
 J. C. Squire, The Birds and Other Poems
 W. B. Yeats, Irish poet published in the United Kingdom:
 The Wild Swans at Coole, significant revision of the 1917 edition: has the poems from the 1917 edition and others, including "An Irish Airman Foresees His Death" and "The Phases of the Moon"; contains: "The Wild Swans at Coole", "Ego Dominus Tuus", "The Scholars" and "On being asked for a War Poem"
 Two Plays for Dancers, (see also, Four Plays for Dancers, published in 1921)
 A Prayer For My Daughter, first published in the November issue of Poetry magazine (later published in Michael Robartes and the Dancer in 1921)

United States
 John Jay Chapman, Songs and Poems
 Babette Deutsch, Banners
 Vachel Lindsay, Bryan, Bryan, Bryan, Bryan, a poem chronicling William Jennings Bryan's 1896 presidential campaign through the eyes of an idealistic sixteen-year-old
 Amy Lowell, Pictures of a Floating World
 Edgar Lee Masters, Starved Rock
 John G. Neihardt, The Song of Three Friends
 Ezra Pound, Quia Pauper Amavi
 John Crowe Ransom, Poems About God
 Charles Reznikoff, Rhythms II, including "The Idiot"
 Louis Untermeyer, editor, Modern American Poetry, New York: Harcourt, Brace and Howe; anthology, more than 130 poems, including "Abraham Lincoln Walks at Midnight", by Vachel Lindsay and verse by Ezra Pound, Sara Teasdale, Stephen Vincent Benét, and Emily Dickinson
 John Hall Wheelock, Dust and Light

Works published in other languages

France
 Paul Claudel, La Messe là-bas
 Léon-Paul Fargue, Poèmes
 Yvan Goll, ed., Le coeur de l’ennemi: Anthologie de poèmes contre la guerre
 Max Jacob, La Defense de Tartuffe
 Francis Jammes, La Vierge et les sonnets, Paris: Mercure de France
 Pierre Reverdy, La Guitare endormie

Indian subcontinent
Including all of the British colonies that later became India, Pakistan, Bangladesh, Sri Lanka and Nepal. Listed alphabetically by first name, regardless of surname:
 Ardoshir Faramji Kharbardar, Bharatno Tankar (Parsi writing in Gujarati)
 Basavaraju Appa Rao, Telugu-language
 Duvvuri Rami Reddi, Krsivaludu, has been called the most prominent poem of the Telugu-language romantic movement; depicts peasants and rural life
 Gopala Krishna Pattanayak, Gopalakrsna Padyabali, Oriya-language, vaishnav lyrics, posthumous edition
 Jammuneshwar Khataniyar, Arun, her first collection of poems, Indian, Assamese-language
 Kumaran Asan, Malayalam-language:
 Cintavistayaya Sita ("Sita's Story"),
 Prarodanam, elegy on the death of A. R. Rajara Varma, a poet, critic and scholar; similar to Percy Bysshe Shelley's Adonais but with a distinctly Indian philosophical attitude
 Nilkanth Sharma Dal, Ramayana, Kashmiri-language poem based for the most part on the Ramacarita-Manas of Tulsidas
 Syama Sundara Das, editor, Parmala Raso, Hindi-language epic poem; written in a language mixing Brjibhasa, Kannauji and Bundeli, published by Kashi Nagari Pracharini Sabha

Spanish language

Spain
 Juan Ramón Jiménez, Piedra y cielo ("Stone and Sky"), Spain
 Ramón del Valle Inclán, La pipa de Kif ("Kif's Pipe"), Spain

Latin America
 Alfonsina Storni, Without Remedy, Argentina

Other languages
 António Botto, Cantares, Portugal
 Khalil Gibran, The Procession, long ode, Arabic
 Charles Gill, Le Cap Éternité: suivi des Étoiles filantes, French language, Canada
 Uri Zvi Greenberg, In tsaytns roysh ("In the tumult of the times"), verse and prose, Yiddish published in Austria-Hungary
 Kitahara Kakushu, Heretics, Japan
 Angiolo Silvio Novaro, Il Fabbro armonioso ("The Harmonious Blacksmith"), Italy
 Kurt Pinthus, editor, Menschheitsdämmerung ("The Twilight of Mankind"), anthology of Expressionist poetry, published in Berlin, Germany
 Anton Schnack, Strophen der Gier ("Verses of greed"), Der Abenteurer ("The adventurer") and Die tausend Gelächter ("The thousand laughs"), Germany
 Kurt Schwitters, "An Anna Blume" ("To Anna Flower" also translated as "To Eve Blossom"), widely noticed and controversial work variously described as a parody of a love poem, an emblem of the chaos and madness of the era, and as a harbinger of a new poetic language; much parodied; originally published in August in Der Sturm magazine, then later in the year in Schwitters' book, Anna Blume, Dichtungen, published by Verlag Paul Steegemann, Hannover (revised edition 1922), Germany
 Edith Sodergran, Gaudy Observations, Sweden
 August Stramm, Tropfblut, Germany, posthumous
 Giuseppe Ungaretti, Allegria di naufragi ("The Joy of Shipwrecks") and La guerra ("The War"), Italy

Awards and honors
 Nobel Prize in Literature: Carl Friedrich Georg Spitteler, Swiss poet and novelist
 Pulitzer Prize for Poetry: Margaret Widdemer, Old Road to Paradise and Carl Sandburg, Corn Huskers

Births
Death years link to the corresponding "[year] in poetry" article:
 January 7 – Robert Duncan (died 1988), American poet associated with the Black Mountain poets and the beat generation, and a key player in the San Francisco Renaissance
 January 9 – William Morris Meredith, Jr. (died 2007), American poet
 January 14
 Kaifi Azmi (died 2002), Indian, Hindi- and Urdu-language poet lyricist and songwriter
 Syed Abdul Malik (died 2000), Indian, Assamese-language short-story writer and poet
 January 19 – Joan Brossa (died 1998), Spanish Catalan poet
 January 20 – Silva Kaputikyan (died 2006), Armenian poet
 February 12 – Subhash Mukhopadhyay (died 2003), Bengali poet and Marxist (surname: Mukhopadhyay)
 March 17 – Abdul Rahman Pazhwak, عبدالرحمن پژواک (died 1995), Afghan, Pashto-language poet, novelist, playwright and diplomat
 March 24 – Lawrence Ferlinghetti, born Lawrence Ferling (died 2021), American beat poet, painter and co-founder of City Lights Bookstore and publisher
 April 15 – Emyr Humphreys (died 2020), Welsh novelist, playwright and poet
 April 17 – J. Rodolfo Wilcock (died 1978), Argentine-born author, poet and translator
 May 28 – May Swenson (died 1989), American poet and playwright
 June 7 – Mira Schendel, born Myrrha Dub (died 1988), Swiss-Brazilian modernist artist and poet
 July 19 – Miltos Sachtouris, Μίλτος Σαχτούρης (died 2005), Greek
 August 30 – Jiří Orten, born Jiří Ohrenstein (died 1941), Czech
 August 31 – Amrita Pritam (died 2005), Punjabi poet and novelist; a woman
 September 2 – Binod Chandra Nayak, Indian, Oriya-language poet
 September 3 – Edwin Honig (died 2011), American poet, critic and translator known for his English renditions of seminal works of Spanish and Portuguese literature
 September 7 – Louise Bennett-Coverley, aka "Miss Lou" (died 2006), Jamaican folklorist, writer and poet
 September 18 – M. Govindan (died 1988), Indian, Malayalam-language poet, short-story writer, playwright and essayist
 September 23 – Tōta Kaneko (died 2018), Japanese haiku poet
 September 26 – Matilde Camus (died 2012), Spanish poet and researcher
 September 29 – Ruth Dallas, born Ruth Mumford (died 2008), New Zealand poet
 October 1 – G. D. Madgulkar (died 1978), Indian, Marathi-language poet, songwriter and short-story writer
 November 4 – Patricia Beer (died 1999), English poet and critic
 November 11 – Hamish Henderson (died 2002), Scottish poet, folk song collector and soldier
 November 18 – Madeline DeFrees (died 2015), American poet
 Also:
 Lance Jeffers (died 1985), African American
 Michalis Katsaros (died 1998), Greek
 Kuroda Saburu, Japanese (surname: Kuroda)
 Bani Ray, Bengali writer, novelist, poet and critic, a woman
 Buddhidhari Singha, Maithili-language poet and fiction writer
 Girija Kumar Mathur (died 1994), Indian, Hindi-language poet
 Yoshioka Minoru (died 1990), Japanese (surname: Yoshioka)

Deaths
Death years link to the corresponding "[year] in poetry" article:
 January 4 – Matilda Betham-Edwards (born 1836), English novelist, travel writer, poet and children's book author
 January 15 – Benjamin Paul Blood (born 1832), American philosopher and poet
 January 23 – Ram Ganesh Gadkari, writing poetry as Govindagraj (born 1885), Indian, Marathi-language poet, playwright and humorist
 January 27 – Endre Ady (born 1877), Hungarian
 February 5 – William Michael Rossetti (born 1839), English poet and essayist
 May 24 – Amado Nervo (died 1870), Mexican
 August 31 – Jóhann Sigurjónsson (born 1880), Icelandic playwright and poet
 October 6 – Ricardo Palma (born 1833), Peruvian novelist, playwright, poet, essayist and writer of short fiction
 October 30 – Ella Wheeler Wilcox (born 1850), American
 December 22 – Sarah Morgan Bryan Piatt (born 1836), American
 Also:
 Akshay Kumar Boral (born 1860), Indian, Bengali-language poet
 Brij Raj (born 1847), Indian, Dogri-Pahadi Brajbhasha poet
 Ganesh Janardan Agasha (born 1852), Indian, Marathi-language poet and literary critic
 Narayan Waman Tilak (born 1861), Indian, Marathi-language Christian poet

See also

 Poetry
 List of years in poetry

References

Poetry
20th-century poetry